The 2013–14 Biathlon World Cup – World Cup 4 was held in Oberhof, Germany, from January 3 until January 5, 2014.

Schedule of events

Medal winners

Men

Women

Achievements

 Best performance for all time

 , 5th place in Sprint
 , 6th place in Sprint
 , 68th place in Sprint
 , 69th place in Sprint
 , 82nd place in Sprint
 , 83rd place in Sprint
 , 84th place in Sprint
 , 17th place in Pursuit and 13th in Mass Start
 , 39th place in Pursuit
 , 56th place in Pursuit
 , 2nd place in Mass Start
 , 14th place in Sprint
 , 30th place in Sprint
 , 44th place in Sprint
 , 45th place in Sprint
 , 71st place in Sprint
 , 88th place in Sprint

 First World Cup race

 , 42nd place in Sprint
 , 46th place in Sprint
 , 47th place in Sprint
 , 51st place in Sprint
 , 59th place in Sprint
 , 73rd place in Sprint
 , 81st place in Sprint
 , 86th place in Sprint
 , 92nd place in Sprint
 , 78th place in Sprint
 , 81st place in Sprint
 , 82nd place in Sprint
 , 83rd place in Sprint
 , 87th place in Sprint

References 

2013–14 Biathlon World Cup
Biathlon World Cup
January 2014 sports events in Europe
Sport in Oberhof, Germany
Biathlon competitions in Germany
2010s in Thuringia